Mohammed Abdullah or Mohammad Abdullah may refer to:
 Mohammad Abdullah (academic) (born 1937), Bangladeshi politician
 Mohammad Abdullah (footballer) (born 1997), Bangladeshi footballer
 Mohammad Abdullah (politician), Bangladeshi politician
 Mohammed Abdullah Al-Ajmi (born 1971), Kuwaiti politician
 Mohammed Abdullah al-Senussi (1981–2011), Libyan fighter
 Mohammed Abdullah al-Shahwani (born 1938), Iraqi general
 Mohammed Abdullah Azam (born 1970), British citizen convicted of terrorist activities
 Mohammed Abdullah Hassan (1856–1920), Somali leader
 Mohammed Abdullah Taha Mattan, Palestinian detainee in Guantanamo
 Mohammed Abdullah Saleh (1939–2001), Yemeni major general and brother of former President Ali Abdullah Saleh
 Mohammed Abdulla Hassan Mohamed (born 1978), Emirati football referee
 Sheikh Abdullah (1905–1982), Indian statesman
 Mohammad Al Gergawi (born 1963), Emirati politician
 Twink (musician) (born 1944), English drummer, singer and songwriter
 Mohamed Abu Abdullah (born 1981), Bangladeshi track and field sprint athlete